The Golan Heights Law is the Israeli law which applies Israel's government and laws to the Golan Heights. It was ratified by the Knesset by a vote of 63―21, on December 14, 1981. Although the law did not use the term, it was considered by the international community and some members of the Israeli opposition as an annexation of the Golan Heights.

The law was passed half a year after the peace treaty with Egypt which included Israeli withdrawal from the Sinai Peninsula.

In February 2018, the Prime Minister of Israel Benjamin Netanyahu stated that "the Golan Heights will remain Israel's forever", after his political rival Yair Lapid called on the international community to recognize Israeli sovereignty over the Golan Heights two months earlier. On March 25, 2019, the United States recognized the Golan Heights as sovereign Israeli territory while the UN reaffirmed that the "..status of Golan has not changed".

The law
The three broad provisions in the Golan Heights Law are the following:

1. "The Law, jurisdiction and administration of the State will take effect in the Golan Heights, as described in the Schedule."

2. "This Law will begin taking effect on the day of its acceptance in the Knesset."

3. "The Minister of the Interior is placed in-charge of the implementation of this Law, and is entitled, in consultation with the Minister of Justice, to enact regulations for its implementation and to formulate regulations on interim provisions regarding the continued application of regulations, directives, administrative directives, and rights and duties that were in effect in the Golan Heights prior to the acceptance of this Law."

Signed:
Yitzhak Navon (President)
Menachem Begin (Prime Minister)
Yosef Burg (Interior Minister)

Passed in the Knesset with a majority of 63 in favour, 21 against.

Controversies
The law was not recognised internationally and determined null and void by United Nations Security Council Resolution 497.

On March 25, 2019, the United States recognized the Golan Heights as sovereign Israeli territory. Following the U.S. announcement, the UN said that United Nations Secretary-General Antonio Guterres is "clear that the status of Golan has not changed."  

Unusually, all three readings took place on the same day. This procedure was heavily criticized by the centre-left opposition. Substantially, the law has mainly been criticized for potentially hindering future negotiations with Syria.

While the Israeli public at large, and especially the law's critics, viewed it as an annexation, the law avoids the use of the word. Prime Minister Menachem Begin responded to Amnon Rubinstein's criticism by saying, "You use the word 'annexation.' I do not use it," and noting that similar wording was used in a 1967 law authorizing the government to apply Israeli law to any part of the Land of Israel.

See also
 United States recognition of the Golan Heights as part of Israel
 International law and the Arab-Israeli conflict
 Jerusalem Law

References

Politics of Israel
Golan Heights
1981 in Israel
Annexation